Tweed River may refer to:

River Tweed, on the historic boundary between Scotland and England
River Tweed, Leicestershire, England
Tweed River (New South Wales), New South Wales, Australia 
Tweed River (New Zealand)
Tweed River (Western Australia), a watercourse in Western Australia

See also
Tweed (disambiguation)